White King, in comics, may refer to:

Marvel Comics characters, members of Hellfire Club:
Edward Buckman, member of the Council of the Chosen
Donald Pierce, member of The Lords Cardinal
Magneto (Marvel Comics), after the Dark Phoenix Saga
Benedict Kine, part of Shinobi Shaw's Inner Circle
Daimon Hellstrom, part of Selene's Inner Circle
DC Comics characters, who are members of Checkmate:
Ahmed Samsarra, during the events around The OMAC Project
Alan Scott, in the post-Infinite Crisis line-up
Mister Terrific (Michael Holt), was the White King’s Bishop and replaced Scott when he stepped down

See also
White King (disambiguation)
Red King (comics), the White King-equivalent rank in the London branch of the Hellfire Club
Black King (comics)